Nemesis 2 may refer to:

 Nemesis 2 (MSX), a video game released for the MSX in 1987
 Nemesis II (Game Boy), a video game released for the Game Boy in 1991
 Nemesis 2: Nebula, a 1995 film

See also
 Nemesis (disambiguation)